Taillandier is a French surname. Notable people with the surname include:

 Albert Taillandier (born 1879), French racing cyclist.
 François Taillandier (born 1955), a French writer.
 Saint-René Taillandier (1817–1879), French writer and critic.
 Maurice Taillandier (1876–1932), French fencer. 
 Jean Taillandier (born 1938), French former football goalkeeper.
 Yvon Taillandier (born 1926), French artist, author and critic.

French culture